Discordia is a genus of snout moths. It was described by Swinhoe, in 1885, and is known from Madagascar.

Species
 Discordia evulsa Swinhoe, 1885
 Discordia sakarahalis Marion & Viette, 1956
 Discordia seyrigalis Marion & Viette, 1956

References

Pyralinae
Pyralidae genera